Wernya cyrtoma is a moth in the family Drepanidae. It was described by Da-Yong Xue and Hong-Xiang Han in 2012. It is found in the Chinese provinces of Jiangxi and Fujian.

Adults are similar to Wernya sechuana, but can be distinguished by a more caesious forewing, which is almost without reddish-brown scales. The forewing postmedial line is distinctly approaching to the wing base at the costa and is more protruding at the middle.

Etymology
The species name refers to the middle protrusion of the forewing postmedial line and is derived from Latin - (meaning curved and swollen).

References

Moths described in 2012
Thyatirinae
Moths of Asia